Penang Football Club (or simply known as Penang FC) is a Malaysian professional football club based in George Town, Penang, that competes in the Malaysia Super League.

Unofficially founded in 1920, officially as Football Association of Penang on 21 October 1921, the club represents the state of Penang in football tournaments. The team has traditionally worn a blue home kit.

They have a long-standing rivalry with Kedah; the two teams from the northern region of Malaysia being engaged in what has been collectively known as the "Northern Region Derby".

The state football team play their home matches at the 20,000 capacity City Stadium in George Town.

Penang had established itself as a major force in Malaysian football between the 1950s to the 1970s. Domestically, Penang has won a record of 3 Division 1 titles, 4 Malaysia Cup titles, 1 Malaysia Premier League, 5 Malaysia FAM League titles, 1 Malaysia FA Cup title and 1 Malaysia Charity Shield. At present, it is one of the 12 teams competing in the Malaysian Super League and the first club from Malaysia to win an Asian title,  Aga Khan Gold Cup, which was the early version of AFC Champions League in 1976.

History

The club was founded in 1920 unofficially, and officially as Football Association of Penang (FAP) in 1921. Penang is the oldest football team in Malaysia and one of the oldest football clubs in Asia. The team is based in the state of Penang in the north of Malaysia. Penang have consistently been a decent team throughout their history, producing players such as the country's first Olympian. Penang is the fourth most successful team in Malaysian football history with 16 champions.

Early years (1920–1950s)
On 21 October 1921, the club was founded. Almost all the big matches were played at Victoria Green, home of the Chinese Recreation Club. The team enter into the final of the Malaysia most prestigious football tournament, Malaysia Cup's final in 1934, but the team lost to Singapore FA with a heartbreaking score of 1–2. Penang enter into the final of the last edition of Malaysia Cup before World War II and they lost to the same opponent in 1934.  During the World War II, football competitions were stopped.

Glory days (1950s–1970s)
An era spanning the 1950s to the 1970s when Penang was among the top teams in inter-state football.

The 1950s saw Penang producing players such as the country's first Olympian, Yeap Cheng Eng, Yeang Kah Chong, Tan Swee Hock, Wong Kam Poh, Yap Hin Hean, Liew Fee Yuen, Lee Ah Loke, the Pang brothers and more. Since the early 1950s, Aziz Ahmad was Penang's top goal-getter in 1953 and 1954. He scored the winning goal when Penang defeated Singapore 3–2 in the 1953 Malaya Cup final in Ipoh.  Penang won 3 Malaysia Cup champions (1953, 1954 and 1958) and 4 FAM Cup champions (1952, 1955, 1956 and 1957).

Some of the well-known FAP officials then were Loh Hoot Yeang, who was president for many years, A.S. Mohamad Mydin, Tan Cheng Hoe, Yaakob Syed and Haris Hussain.

David Choong was president in 1962 when Penang made the FAM Cup final, but lost 3–4 to Selangor in a pulsating contest on May 12 before a capacity crowd at the City Stadium.

In October 1963, Penang trounced Perlis 13–0 in a Malaysia Cup tie at the City Stadium.

Aziz took over as captain when Cheng Eng retired. The early 1960s also saw a glittering array of "stars".

By 1965, veterans such as Siang Teik and Aziz made way as Penang rebuilt.
M. Kuppan took over as captain with Yeap Kim Hock, James Raju and Ibrahim Mydin the only other survivors.

For the first time, Penang also preferred the services of four British Airmen based at the RAF Support unit which was based at the Royal Australian Air Force (RAAF)  Butterworth base which participated in the local league. They were John Leather, Clive Warren, Vic Probert and Alan Peacock.

The late 1960s saw the emergence of Aziz's nephews, the Abdullah brothers—Namat and Shaharuddin. At his peak, Shaharuddin was a prolific goal-getter together with Isa Bakar.

Penang made the Malaysia Cup final in 1968 to face mighty Selangor but nobody expected it to be a massacre. Selangor romped home 8–1 in one of the most one-sided finals ever.

In 1974, Penang heroically knocked Singapore out in the semifinal to face northern rival Perak in the final. Namat Abdullah led Penang to a 2–1 victory in what was to be the state's last Malaysia Cup final victory.  Penang stepped into the final of Malaysia Cup in 1977 as they lost the match to Singapore.  In 1976, Penang became the first and only club from Malaysia to win the Aga Khan Gold Cup which was the early version of Asian Club Championship, beating Dhaka Mohammedan Sporting Club 3-0 in the final at the Bangabandhu National Stadium under the guidance of coach Lim Boon Kheng.

Stagnation (1980s–mid-1990s)
Football Association of Malaysia introduced the Malaysia First Division League in 1982. Penang was one of the founding members of the league. The first edition of the league saw Penang become the champion. In 1983, Penang was the first runner-up of the league. After that, the team faced stagnation until the mid-1990s because failed to win any major trophy.

Resurgence (late 1990s–early 2000s)
The glory days came after the team faced the stagnation period for more than 15 years. Penang enter into the FA Cup final for the first time in the team history in 1997 and they lost to Selangor.  After the disappointment, Penang won the 1998 Malaysia Super League.  The team failed to defend the champion as they only manage to get runner-up in 1999. The 2000 FA Cup saw Penang lost to Terengganu after a nail-biting penalty shootouts.  Penang was the runner-up of the top division league in 2000. After two consecutive years as the runner-up of Malaysia Super League, Penang become the champion of the league in 2001.  Penang FA historically won the FA Cup for the first time in 2002 thanks to the goal scored by Gustavo Romero on the 65 minutes.  Penang first attempt into the Charity Shield saw the team won the trophy after they beat Selangor.

Walking downhill and financial crisis (2003–2009)
Although the team got a good start by winning the Charity Shield, but the team only finished mid table in the league and in round two of the FA Cup. Penang finished third in the group stage of the Malaysia Cup and failed to qualify for the second round. In 2004, Penang ranked fifth out of 8 in the league and eliminated in the second round of FA Cup. Yunus Alif's boys won the group stage of Malaysia Cup but lost in second round. The league performance in 2006 is worse than 2005 as the team only ranked sixth. Penang won the first round of FA Cup, but they failed to qualify for the third round. They top the group of Malaysia Cup for two consecutive years but still can't advanced for the third round after losing the second round matches. The next season saw Penang ranked sixth again in the league and lost the first round match of FA Cup. The team lost the quarter final matches of Malaysia Cup. In 2006–07 season of Malaysia Super League, the team ranked tenth throughout the league. Penang finished the journey of FA Cup in round one. Penang finished fifth out of six in the Malaysia Cup group stage. New coach, Mohd Bakar was appointed to replace Josef Herel in the 2007–08 season. The Panthers finished 12th in the league, round two in FA Cup and last in the Malaysia Cup group stage. For the same season until 2012, the club was facing a critical financial condition. The state's footballers had not been paid for four months, and called on the current administration to honour the contracts signed with players. In 2009, Penang FA finished third from the last in the top division league. Penang was knocked out from the FA Cup in round two for two consecutive years. Penang was eliminated from the Malaysia Cup tournament after finished third in the group stage.

Darkest period (2010–2012)
In 2010, the darkest period ever in the team history came. Reduan Abdullah squad had only collected 10 points and finished at the bottom of the league. Penang was relegated from the top flight after 18 consecutive spells in the top flight of Malaysian football. The club continued to decline and in 2011 the worst fears were reached when they were relegated to FAM League after the team struggled in the second division with only collected 4 points after 22 matches.  Janos Krecska was appointed as coach in 2012. The team finished mid-table in the third tier end of the year.

The comeback (2013–2015)
Penang FA's legend, Merzagua Abderrazak, took over as the club head coach in 2013. The aim of the club, which was to promote to the Malaysia Premier League, was achieved successfully under the tactician.  Penang won a silverware after an 11-year wait. However, they may have to leave their talismanic Moroccan coach Merzagua Abderrazzak because he needs to obtain an A-level coaching licence in his home country to be able to continue coaching.

Due to the problem, the club appointed K. Devan as the new head coach. Under his guidance Penang claimed the third spot of the Premier League and qualified into Malaysia Cup after absent for four years. Penang finished last place in the group stage with four points after six matches. K. Devan's contract was not renewed and he was signed by Negeri Sembilan.

Jacksen F. Tiago took over from K. Devan as the head coach of Penang for the next season. His skills and strategies to be somehow a success to the squad when showing good performance facing with major teams in the preseason match; Sime Darby, Johor Darul Takzim, Perak, Selangor, Kelantan. The most notable were the matches versus Selangor and Kelantan which ended with the score of 2–0 favouring the home team. Penang also stepped into the quarter final of Malaysia FA Cup after 13 years. A dramatic finish in the 2015 league campaign saw Penang FA win the runner-up on Malaysian Premier League after so much struggle in 2014 and claimed a ticket to the top flight.

In the Top Flight (2016-2017 Season)
Promoted after finishing second in the 2015 Malaysia Premier League, Penang beefed their squad with several youngsters from the Harimau Muda project and signed three new imports. The Panthers were hopeful of at least staying in the MSL but things did not go so well as Penang soon found themselves stuck in the relegation zone that led to the 'resting' of Jacksen F. Tiago. The appointment of MSL winning coach Bojan Hodak as chief executive officer and Nenad Bacina as head coach to replace Jacksen offered some promise for the second half of the season but Penang still struggled to find consistency. It wasn't until the final day of the season, in the final minute at that, did Penang save their top flight status thanks to the goal from Faizat Ghazli.

I-League winning coach, Ashley Westwood signed a two years contract with the club in November 2016 to replace Nenad and Bojan. However, Penang FA terminated their contract with head coach, Ashley Westwood under mutual consent due to poor results in March 2017 and he was replaced by Zainal Abidin Hassan.

Zairil Khir Johari, who took over from Nazir Ariff Mushir Ariff has resigned as president of the Penang Football Association (FA) following a bad season by the Penang Panthers in the 2017 Super League on Oct 9, 2017. PFA trustee Datuk Abdul Rashid Ismail, who was then act as president, were trying to resolve the issue of player's salary pending. Former player Reinaldo Lobo, had reported PFA to Fifa after the club failed to pay him for six months.

Relegated to Malaysia Premier League (2018 - 2020)
After relegation to Malaysia Premier League, Zainal Abidin Hassan remains the head coach in charge of the club with him, the likes of Mohd Faiz Subri, Yong Kuong Yong, Sanna Nyassi and Mohd Azrul Ahmad were retained. But the departures has seen Syamer Kutty Abba moving to Johor Darul Ta'zim, Jafri Firdaus Chew & K. Reuben to PKNS FC, Rafiuddin Rodin to Perak. Somehow Zainal Abidin Hassan manages to keep The Panthers in Malaysia Premier League as they finished in 10th position for 2018 season and thus avoided a successive drop of division, having been relegated from the Super League the previous season. As of August 2018, FAP are currently laden with a total debt of RM11.2mil, which the players have not received their monthly income for four-and-a-half months.

Dr Amar Pritpal Abdullah was elected as Penang FA president after edging out Datuk Seri Ho Kwee Cheng, promises to settle Premier League players’ outstanding salaries amounting to RM3.5mil. Penang FA who only narrowly escaped relegation to the FAM Cup in the 2018 Premier League season searched for stability ahead of the 2019 season under the helm of new management of the team. It was announced later that former Hanelang F.C. head coach Ahmad Yusof to replace the outgoing Zainal Abidin Hassan.

The FA of Penang have set a modest target for the 2019 season, to stay in the Premier League by aiming for a top five finish next season. A move that is designed to bring stability to the team after two horrendous seasons as new management work to settle past problems. Penang state government will be taking up the responsibilities to clear the debt on a budget separate from the one awarded to the Penang FA. The Panthers however are on the hunt for more sponsors to come in to supplement that amount. Penang FA struggle to manage themselves after half of season at poor position (bottom league). Manzoor Azwira has been appointed as a Head Coach to replace Ahmad Yusof. Penang FA back with changes under Manzoor Azwira. He bought new import player like Casagrande and Sergio Aguero and at the end, Penang FA climb to 2nd placed and secure a place to Super League. less than 24 hours after securing promotion to the Super League, Penang FA found themselves back in the Premier League after being docked six points by the FA of Malaysia (FAM) due to a decision by Fifa. This came after a complaint filed by former Penang defender Reinaldo Lobo to Fifa over salary claims.

In 2020 the government of Malaysia stopped all sports activities due to the COVID-19 pandemic. Penang FA was on track to winning the league after being unbeaten in 8 matches. They made in again to secure promotion to the Super League next season after beating Kuala Lumpur 2–1 at City Stadium. Penang eventually won their first ever Premier League title after beating Kelantan United 4-0.

Crest and colours

Since the club's foundation in 1921, the club have had two main crests. The first, adopted when the team was founded, its backgrounds colours of the club crest were navy blue and white. At the top left and bottom right of the crest are the capital letters of 'F' and 'A' in navy blue with white background, which are the abbreviation of 'Football Association'. At the bottom left of the crest is a leather ball, which was the early football ball. The Prince of Wales's feathers and its motto, 'Ich Dien' which means 'I serve' were at top left of the crest, both elements were in white colour with navy blue background. The name of the state, 'Penang', is written in capital letter, white colour with navy blue background.

In the early 1990s, the crest underwent some variations as part of an attempt to modernise the previous crest. The capital letters of 'F' and 'A' were changed into three-dimensional form, with navy blue edges and white fill colour. The ball at the bottom left was changed into a modern ball with pentagonal and hexagonal patterns, and the Prince of Wales's feathers on the top left was also modernised with its motto was removed, fill colours for both elements were changed to blue, with white background.

Colours
Penang FC's traditional home colours are sky blue and yellow which are taken from the colours of the Penang state flag which stand for the sea surrounding the island and peace respectively. Navy blue and yellow have also been used severally. Traditional away kit colours have been either yellow or white. However, in recent years several different colours have been used, such as green, pink and orange.

The current home jersey sports a lighter shade of blue which is a better representation of the blue colour on the state flag. The current away jersey is white while the alternate jersey is black with yellow stripes.

Support
Penang's traditional fanbase comes from all over the George Town area including the other suburbs such as Jelutong, Air Itam, Tanjung Bungah, Bayan Lepas and even from the mainland. Penang's hardcore supporters are the so-called Ultras Panthers supporters, also known as Green Terrace Comrades UP11. Ultras Panthers was founded in 2011. In every match the Penang team played, they will be found in a group standing at the supporters area. The main colours for these supporters are usually in blue with a blue-yellow scarf and banners just like the Penang's team kits colours. These supporters always bring drums and large colorful flags to the stadiums.

Established in 2017, the Penang Football Fans Club (PFFC) is the official supporter club which is registered under the law of Malaysia. The main mission of PFFC is to unite football supporters in Penang. Besides it will also act as a channel between the fans and the team.

There are also numerous supporters clubs such as Demi Pulau Pinang, Penang Brotherhood, Penang FC Fan Club, Haria Penang 69, Nindia Bandaraya, Brigade 07, Boys Of North and more in the state. Penang had an average gate of 7,301 in the 2016 competitive campaign. Sometimes, tourists from foreign countries also attended the matches.

As of June 2020, Penang had 134,650 followers on social media, the ninth highest among football clubs in Malaysia.

At matches, Penang fanatic fans sing chants such as "Haria Penang Haria", "Sehati Sejiwa" which means "One Heart, One Soul" and the state anthem "Untuk Negeri Kita", which means "For our state", to boost their beloved players' morale. Fans also throw toilet rolls to the pitch before the match begins. The well-known and popular slogan among Penang FC supporters is "Haria Penang Haria". It is used as "words of spirit" during and off the game, and as the slogan among supporters.

Rivalries
Kedah is the biggest rival for Penang. Penang fans consider their main rivalries to be with (in order) Kedah, Perak and Perlis. Matches against fellow northern region sides KSK Tambun Tulang F.C., Kuala Muda Naza F.C., Kedah United F.C., Sungai Ara F.C., PBAPP F.C., SDMS Kepala Batas F.C., Bukit Tambun F.C., and Perak YBU F.C. have only taken place intermittently, due to the clubs often being in separate divisions.

Derby
Northern Region Derby is the name given to football matches that involves Penang and Kedah. Both of them were located in the northern region of Malaysia. City Stadium or Penang State Stadium and Darul Aman Stadium are packed by fans from Kedah and Penang during derby matches. The match usually creates a lively atmosphere, with numerous banners unfolded before the start of the game.

Friendships
Although Penang's main rivals mostly are from the northern region of Malaysia, especially Kedah, but there is also a strong supporter of friendship with Kedah and there are good relations with the fans of Perak and Perlis. "This is the northern region", is a slogan which shows their good friendships.

Kit manufacturers and shirt sponsors

Grounds

Home ground

Up to the late 1950s, almost all the big matches were played at Victoria Green, home of the Chinese Recreation Club, before the completion of the City Stadium in the 1950s.

Penang State Stadium which located in Batu Kawan was also the home ground of the club from 2000 to 2011 and 2016 to 2017. It was built in 2000 with a capacity of 40,000 to host the 8th Sukma Games (Malaysian Games). In 2007, this stadium hosted the Malaysian FA Cup Final.

The City Stadium has a capacity of 20,000 people. The oldest stadium still in use in Malaysia, it was built in 1948 to provide a venue for sports activities in George Town, especially as a football pitch. It is also well known for the vociferous home support, dubbed the "Keramat Roar". In 2019, the state football team then returned to the City Stadium after using the Penang State Stadium.  In 2018, this stadium hosted the inaugural Asia Pacific Masters Games .

Training ground

The Jawi Public Field is the training ground of Penang FC located in South Seberang Perai District, Penang.

Previously, The USM Sports Centre was the training ground of Penang FC located in the campus of University of Science, Malaysia in Penang. The complex consists of several grass pitches. The stadium is also the home ground for the reserve team, as well as the home ground for USM FC. The sports centre also consists of a gymnasium and swimming pool.

Sometimes, Penang also train at the Penang Sports Club. It is located in the city of George Town covering a land area of about 16 acres.

Seasons

Since Professional Era

Updated on 15 December 2022.

Note:

Pld = Played, W = Won, D = Drawn, L = Lost, F = Goals for, A = Goals against, D = Goal difference, Pts= Points, Pos = Position

Notes:'''
   2020 Season cancelled due to the 2020 Coronavirus Pandemic.
Source:Rec.Sport.Soccer Statistics Foundation-Malaysia 2016

Records and statistics

Domestic records

Penang are the fifth most successful football club in Malaysia for having won a total of 15 Malaysian football titles.

Penang are the team who won first inaugural Malaysia League 1982 and FAM Cup 1952.

The club's highest ever league finish was 1st in the Super League in 1982, 1998 and 2001. Their lowest ever league finish was 6th in the 2012 Malaysia FAM League.

Penang biggest win in Malaysia Cup final was 3–0 against Singapore FA in 1954. Penang heaviest lost in Malaysia Cup final was 1–8 against Selangor FA in 1968.

Asian record

0 due to economic trouble in the country. 
1 due to club financial problem.

Player records
Shukor Salleh is the player who played for the club for the longest time which is 20 years. He had only played for Penang in his career. He won the National Sportsman Award in 1977. Furthermore, he was the second and the last football player after Mokhtar Dahari to be given that award. He was also the first Penang player to be awarded the AFC Century Club award in 1999 and included in the FIFA Century Club for representing the national team at least 100 times in international tournaments.

Lutz Pfannenstiel, He holds the record for the only footballer to play professionally in each of the six recognised continental associations by FIFA.

In 2017, Mohd Faiz Subri became the first Asian to win the FIFA Puskás Award.  He was awarded for his physics-defying free kick that clinched a goal during the Malaysian Super League match against Pahang at the City Stadium on 16 February 2016.

On 3 August 2021, Rafael Vitor scored the fastest goal in the Malaysia Super League when he scored a goal just 9 seconds after the opening whistle against Perak FC.

Club top scorer (since professional era)Players who scored 10 or more goals are listed. Club honours 

Domestic

(*inaugural winners)
(**Penang FA Reserves)
(***Persatuan Bolasepak Melayu Pulau Pinang (PBMPP))

Asian

Personal honours

Notable former players
This list of prominent former players, who played in this team includes those who received international caps while playing for the team, made significant contributions to the team in terms of appearances or goals while playing for the team, or who made significant contributions to the sport either before they played for the team, or after they left. It is not complete or all inclusive, and additions and refinements will continue to be made over time.

 Yeap Cheng Eng
 Aziz Ahmad
 Dave MacLaren
 Namat Abdullah
 Shaharuddin Abdullah
 Mohammed Bakar
 Shukor Salleh
 Ali Bakar
 Isa Bakar
 Desmond David
 Ahmad Yusof
 Lutz Pfannenstiel
 Azman Adnan
 Mohd Hasmawi Hassan
 Chee Wan Hoe
 Merzagua Abderrazak
 Kamarulzaman Hassan
 Ooi Hoe Guan
 Norizam Salaman
 Faiz Subri
 Yong Kuong Yong
 Mafry Balang
 R. Surendran
 M.Yoges
 Azmi Muslim
 Syukur Saidin
 Bobby Gonzales

Finances and ownership

The club is owned by the Penang Chief Minister Incorporated as one of the GLCs, under the chairmanship of Soon Lip Chee, who is also the Penang State Executive Councillor for Youth and Sports. Prior to the privatisation of Malaysian League, the club was owned by the Football Association of Penang (FAP), in which the association also runs the domestic leagues of the states, which is known as FAP League.

FAP was also troubled with debts and players' salary payments were reportedly delayed two to three months over the two years. The delayed salary payments were said to have led some players to take money from bookies to give away games. The poor performance of the Penang team, languishing at the bottom of the Premier League table, also kicked up storm at the Penang State Legislative Assembly in May 2011.

Management & coaching staff

Board of Directors

Management

Coaching and technical staff

Players

First-team squad

 (captain)

Out on loan

Under-23s

Development squadsFor further information: Penang F.C. Reserves''

Head coaches

Head coaches since semi-pro era

Notes

References

External links

 Penang FC official website

 
Malaysia Super League clubs
Football clubs in Malaysia
Malaysia Cup winners